PGE Skra Bełchatów 2015–2016 season is the 2015/2016 volleyball season for Polish professional volleyball club PGE Skra Bełchatów.

The club competes in:
 Polish Championship
 Polish Cup
 CEV Champions League

PGE Skra got eliminated from 2015–16 CEV Champions League in playoffs 6 by Zenit Kazan (first match 3-2, second 0-3). After failure head coach Miguel Angel Falasca was fired during clubs meeting. The decision was announced on March 28, 2016. Management of Skra announced also that duties of head coach to the end of season 2015/16 were taken by Falasca's assistant Italian Fabio Storti, but next day on March 29, 2016 contract signed new head coach - Philippe Blain.

Team roster

Squad changes for the 2014–2015 season
In:

Out:

Most Valuable Players

PlusLiga

General classification

Results, schedules and standings

2015–16 PlusLiga

Regular season

Final round (for bronze medal)

2015–16 Polish Cup

2015–16 CEV Champions League

Pool E

Playoff 12

Playoff 6

References

PGE Skra Bełchatów seasons